Emmeline Hawthorne is a New Zealand actress who is known for her role as Anne Greenlaw on the long running New Zealand soap opera Shortland Street. An acclaimed stage and screen actress, she played Hannah Priest in the television series Jackson's Wharf, Bane in Xena: Warrior Princess and the lead role of Theresa in the 2003 feature Orphans and Angels. She is the daughter of Raymond and Elizabeth Hawthorne and sister of Sophia Hawthorne, who died in 2016.

Filmography

Awards
Hawthorne was nominated for the NZ Film Award for Best Performance in a Feature Film for her work in Orphans and Angels.

References

External links

1980 births
Living people
New Zealand television actresses
New Zealand film actresses
New Zealand stage actresses
New Zealand soap opera actresses
21st-century New Zealand actresses
20th-century New Zealand actresses